Gary Ginstling is an American music executive. .

Education
Ginstling holds degrees from Yale University, the Juilliard School and the Anderson School of Management at the University of California, Los Angeles.

Commenting on his time at Juilliard to the New York Times,  Ginstling said: “I was singularly focused on getting a job in a great orchestra. I don’t think there was an awareness that a career in the arts was something worth considering.”

Career
Prior to joining the New York Philharmonic, Ginstling was executive director of the National Symphony Orchestra (NSO) in Washington, D.C. beginning in  August 2017.  While at the NSO, Ginstling developed new ways of reaching audiences, driving up ticket sales, subscriptions and donations.

Before that, Ginstling was the chief executive officer of the Indianapolis Symphony Orchestra for five years where he settled a musician's strike upon arrival and increased revenue 44% and general manager of the Cleveland Orchestra from 2008 to 2013.

Ginstling worked as director of communications and external affairs for the San Francisco Symphony and in 2004 he was executive director of the  Berkeley Symphony where he grew attendance by more than 25%.

Prior to moving into orchestra management Ginstling had a three-year role in the technology industry working as a product marketing manager at Sun Microsystems.

In 1998, Ginstling was on the faculty of the University of California at Irvine's Department of Music as a lecturer in music.

Ginstling spent 12 years performing as a clarinet player with the New World Symphony before moving into academia.

Other activities
Ginstling serves on boards of the League of American Orchestras and the Electronic Media Association.

References

Living people
Yale University alumni
American arts administrators
New York Philharmonic
Year of birth missing (living people)
Sun Microsystems people
American music industry executives
Juilliard School alumni
People from Livingston, New Jersey
American clarinetists
American marketing people
National Symphony Orchestra